Bizhanabad-e Yek (also Romanized as Bīzhanābād-e Yek; also known as Bīzhanābād-e ‘Olyā) is a village in Rudbar Rural District, in the Central District of Rudbar-e Jonubi County, Kerman Province, Iran. At the 2006 census, its population was 1,180, in 253 families.

References 

Populated places in Rudbar-e Jonubi County